The Peksha is a river in Vladimir Oblast, Russia. It is a left tributary of the Klyazma. The town of Kolchugino is situated by the Peksha.

References 

Rivers of Vladimir Oblast